Zionist Federation may refer to:

Zionist Federation of Australia
Zionist Federation of Great Britain and Ireland
Zionist Federation of New Zealand

Similar organizations
Netzer Olami, a worldwide Progressive Zionist youth movement
North American Federation of Temple Youth, its North American branch
World Zionist Organization
World Zionist Congress, its elected governing body
American Zionist Movement  (AZM), its American affiliate
World Union of Jewish Students (WUJC), umbrella organisation for Unions of Jewish Students
Australasian Union of Jewish Students (AUJS), a federation of Jewish student societies
European Union of Jewish Students (EUJS), a federation of Jewish student societies
Zionist Organization of America

See also
American Sephardi Federation
Jewish Federation
Jewish Federations of North America
Conference of Presidents of Major American Jewish Organizations